is a Japanese whisky distillery. The distillery released its first single malt in late 2007, under the "Akashi" label.

References

Notes

Bibliography

External links

 – official site (in English)

Distilleries in Japan
Japanese brands
Japanese whisky
1984 establishments in Japan